The Lantern is a 1938 Czech film directed by Karel Lamač and starring Jarmila Kšírová, Theodor Pištěk and Jarmila Beránková. It was based on a play by Alois Jirásek. Lamač made a silent film based on the same play in 1925.

Cast
 Jarmila Kšírová - Countess
 Jarmila Beránková - Hanička
 Otomar Korbelář - Miller Libor
 Theodor Pištěk - Royal official
 František Kreuzmann - Mr. Franc
 Gustav Hilmar as Carpenter Braha
 Jára Kohout as Klásek
 Ferenc Futurista - Vodník Ivan
 Eman Fiala - Vodník Michal
 Jiří Koldovský as Count
 František Voborský as Teacher Zajíček
 Anna Gabrielová - Princess's Chambermaid

References

External links

1938 films
1930s fantasy films
Films based on works by Alois Jirásek
Films directed by Karel Lamač
Czechoslovak black-and-white films
Film remakes
Sound film remakes of silent films
Czech fantasy films
1930s Czech films